Wasatullah Khan  is a Pakistani journalist, columnist and host. Has been associated with BBC Urdu since 1991. He authored a book on the 2010 Pakistan floods named Sailab Diaries (Flood Diaries). He is also a co-host of a talk-show Zara Hut Kay for Dawn News.

Works
 Sailab Diaries, a book on the 2010 Pakistan floods
 Baat say Baat, a weekly column for the BBC Urdu
 Zara Hut Kay, a daily talk show co-hosts for Dawn News.

References 

Living people
Pakistani journalists
Pakistani columnists
Pakistani television hosts
Year of birth missing (living people)